Between the Dreaming and the Coming True is the fifth studio album by contemporary Christian musician, Bebo Norman. The album is the fourth with Essential Records, and his sixth album overall including his first independent release. This album was released on September 19, 2006, and the producers are Jason Ingram, Bebo Norman and Glenn Rosenstein.

Critical reception

AllMusic's Jared Johnson said that "Between the Dreaming is a fine feather in Norman's cap, a marquee performance for an already-seasoned artist."

CCM Magazine'''s Christa A. Banister said that "for those who may feel like they want to sit this one out because of what could be perceived as depressing subject matter that hits a little too close to home, there’s significant payoff if you’re up for the challenge. While hope in Christ is found in each song—even in the melancholy closer".

Cross Rhythms' Philip Croft said that "on first impression I have to admit that I was a little disappointed with this album as the songs seemed to lack immediacy. Sure the outstanding, slightly throaty voice was there as were inventive arrangements and production values that we have come to expect but I simply couldn't remember any of the tunes. I decided to persevere though and played the CD several times driving to and from work and it was amazing how the songs grew on me. There is a real lyrical depth to this one that no doubt comes from the experience and growing maturity that Bebo Norman now has. Intelligent pop rock by a man clearly working through some deep spiritual issues."CCM Magazines Russ Breimeier said that he "can't help but wonder if some fans might not be disappointed that Norman has downplayed his rootsy side in favor of this bigger pop sound, though the album still remains in step with his body of work. After 2004's slightly disappointing Try, Norman rebounds impressively here, saying that he's discovered newfound artistic confidence as an artist. It clearly shows—I admire this new Bebo Norman enough to call Between his best."

Jesus Freak Hideout's John DiBiase said that the album is "a fine addition to an always impressive catalog of music, Bebo Norman's latest venture Between The Dreaming And The Coming True serves as a fair mix between the infectious melancholy folk pop of Myself When I Am Real, and the more upbeat approach the artist took with Try. Once again taking everyday life experiences, from love to heartache to loss, and balancing it out with heartfelt and meaningful worship, it's hard not to want to say that Mr. Norman's done it again."

Melodic.net's Cor Jan Kat said that they "can surely say that this one is definitely a winner! Great melodic pop with soaring vocals of Bebo. The rootsy folkish sound of his first albums has for the most part been replaced by a modern popsound with hints of Michael W. Smith, Steven Curtis Chapman, Downhere and John Elefante (?To find my way to you?)." In addition, Kat wrote that in the "collaborating on the songwriting and production with Jason Ingram this album has a new and fresh sound. I have to say that I like the ?new and improved? Bebo Norman. There are plenty of songs to enjoy on this album from uptempo poprockers to breathtaking ballads!"

New Release Tuesday's Kevin Davis said that "the songs take you on a journey and the collaboration with Jason Ingram is brilliant."

New Release Tuesday's Grace Thorson said that "the songs are beautiful and perfectly done on it."

New Release Tuesday's Kevin McNeese wrote that the album had "choruses soar, drums thunder, and the piano lets loose drapes of brilliant texture bathing Norman's message with a more vivid light."

The Phantom Tollbooth said that "this is easily Bebo’s best recording and one of the best of the year."

Track listing

 Personnel 
 Bebo Norman – lead and backing vocals, acoustic guitar, horn arrangements (4)
 Jason Ingram – keyboards, grand piano, programming, backing vocals 
 Gabe Scott – accordion
 Shane Keister – grand piano (6)
 Gary Corbett – programming (6), vibraphone (6)
 Adam Lester – acoustic guitar, electric guitar 
 David May – acoustic guitar
 Chris Rodriguez – acoustic guitar (6), electric guitar (6)
 Glenn Rosenstein – slide guitar (6), glockenspiel (6)
 Tony Lucido – bass
 Craig Young – bass (6)
 Ken Lewis – drums, percussion, loops
 Dan Needham – drums (6), percussion (6)
 John Mark Painter – string arrangements, French horn (4), trombone (4), trumpet (4), horn arrangements (4)
 Anthony LaMarchina – cello
 Sarighani Reist – cello
 Monisa Angell – viola
 Kristin Wilkinson – viola, string contractor
 David Angell – violin
 David Davidson – violin
 Pamela Sixfin – violin
 Mary Kathryn Vanosdale – violin

 Production Tracks 1–5 & 7–11 Producers – Jason Ingram and Bebo Norman 
 Engineers – Vance Powell and Rusty Varenkamp
 Assistant Engineers – Allen Ditto and Chad Sylva
 Overdubs and Vocals recorded by Jason Ingram 
 Strings recorded by Steve Bishir 
 Bass and Drum Editing – Brett Vargason
 Grand piano on Tracks 5 & 9 engineered by Blair MastersTrack 6 Producer, Overdub and Vocal Engineer – Glenn Rosenstein
 Engineer – Steve Bishir 
 Assistant Engineer – Michael TeaneyOther Credits'''
 Executive Producer – Jordyn Connor 
 Mixed by Shane D. Wilson 
 Mastered by Richard Dodd 
 A&R Production – Michelle Pearson
 Production Coordinator – Traci Bishir 
 Art Direction – Stephanie McBrayer and Tim Parker 
 Design – Tim Parker 
 Photography – Robert Ascroft
 Artwork – Missy Ascroft and Traci Sgrignoli

Charts

References

2006 albums
Bebo Norman albums
Essential Records (Christian) albums